Haliotis parva, common name the canaliculate abalone, is a species of sea snail, a marine gastropod mollusk in the family Haliotidae, the abalones.

Haliotis parva was among the first seven haliotids named by Linnaeus (together with Haliotis asinina, Haliotis marmorata, Haliotis midae, Haliotis striata, Haliotis tuberculata and Haliotis varia).

Description
The size of the shell varies between 25 mm and 50 mm.
"The rather small shell is oval and depressed. It has a strong rounded rib on the upper surface, parallel with the row of holes. The surface of the shell is all over covered with fine closer spiral threads and much finer radiating striae. The form varies from elliptical to rounded-oval. The spiral rib of the upper surface is also variable in prominence. There are no radiating lamellae between the spire and the rib, and as usual there is a shallow channel outside of the row of holes. The colour is between scarlet and brick-red, with irregular, often radiating white patches. The spire is raised and rather prominent. The inner surface is silvery, with red and green reflections. It has  a furrow corresponding to the rib of the outside. The columellar shelf is narrow and flattened. The six perforations are subcircular and open."

Distribution
This species occurs in the Atlantic Ocean from Southern Angola to South Africa.

References

External links
 To Biodiversity Heritage Library (44 publications)
 To Encyclopedia of Life
 To GenBank (2 nucleotides; 2 proteins)
 To World Register of Marine Species
 

parva
Gastropods described in 1758
Taxa named by Carl Linnaeus